Vasilios Pavlidis (born 1897, date of death unknown) was a Greek wrestler. He competed at the 1920, 1924 and 1928 Summer Olympics.

References

External links
 

1897 births
Year of death missing
Olympic wrestlers of Greece
Wrestlers at the 1920 Summer Olympics
Wrestlers at the 1924 Summer Olympics
Wrestlers at the 1928 Summer Olympics
Greek male sport wrestlers
Sportspeople from Athens